Bodyguard Kiba may refer to:

Bodyguard Kiba (manga), a manga by author Ikki Kajiwara
Karate Kiba or Bodyguard Kiba, a 1973 film directed by Ryuichi Takamori starring Sonny Chiba
Bodyguard Kiba (1993 film), a 1993 film directed by Takashi Miike

See also
 Bodyguard (disambiguation)
 Kiba (disambiguation)